William Patrick Huizenga (born January 31, 1969) is an American politician serving as the U.S. representative for , serving in Congress since 2011. The district, numbered as the 2nd district from 2011 to 2023, covers much of Lake Michigan's eastern shore and many of Grand Rapids's suburbs, including Muskegon, Holland, Kentwood, and Grand Haven.

A member of the Republican Party, Huizenga served in the Michigan House of Representatives from 2003 to 2009.

Early life
Born to a family of Dutch Americans, Huizenga is the co-owner and operator of Huizenga Gravel Company, a family business in Jenison, Michigan. In the early 1990s, he worked in real estate. He left real estate in 1996, becoming an aide to U.S. Representative Pete Hoekstra.

Michigan House of Representatives
Starting with his first election in 2002, Huizenga represented the 90th district for three terms, winning reelection in 2004 and 2006. After the 2006 election he was term limited. The district is in Ottawa County and includes Holland, Zeeland, Hudsonville, Blendon Township, Jamestown Township, Holland Township, and Zeeland Township.

Huizenga voted for the initial version of the Michigan Business Tax, but opposed the 2% surcharge and a sales and services tax later in the process.

U.S House of Representatives

Elections

2010 

After serving 18 years, Republican incumbent Peter Hoekstra retired to run for the Republican nomination for governor. Huizenga defeated Jay Riemersma, State Senator Wayne Kuipers, businessman Bill Cooper, and three others in the Republican primary election—the real contest in this heavily Republican district—on August 3, 2010. Huizenga defeated Democratic nominee Fred Johnson, 64% to 32%. The district was rated "Solid Republican" by The New York Times. The district and its predecessors have been in Republican hands for all but four years since 1873, and without interruption since 1935.

2012 

Huizenga was reelected, defeating Democratic nominee Willie German Jr., Mary Buzuma of the Libertarian Party, Ronald Graeser of the U.S. Taxpayers Party and William Opalicky of the Green Party.

2014 

Huizenga was reelected, defeating Democratic nominee Dean Vanderstelt, Ronald Welch of the Libertarian Party and Ronald Graeser of the U.S. Taxpayers Party.

2016 

Huizenga was reelected, defeating Democratic nominee Dennis Murphy, Erwin Haas of the Libertarian Party, and Matthew Brady of the Green Party.

2018 

Huizenga was reelected, defeating Democratic nominee Rob Davison and Ronald Graeser of the U.S. Taxpayers Party.

2020 

Huizenga was reelected, defeating Democratic nominee Bryan Berghoef, Max Riekse of the Libertarian Party, Gerald Van Sickle of the U.S. Taxpayers Party, and Jean-Michel Creviere of the Green Party.

2022

Tenure
In December 2020, Huizenga was one of 126 Republican members of the House of Representatives to sign an amicus brief in support of Texas v. Pennsylvania, a lawsuit filed at the United States Supreme Court contesting the results of the 2020 presidential election, in which Joe Biden defeated incumbent Donald Trump. The Supreme Court declined to hear the case on the basis that Texas lacked standing under Article III of the Constitution to challenge the results of an election held by another state.

House Speaker Nancy Pelosi issued a statement that called signing the amicus brief an act of "election subversion." She also reprimanded Huizenga and the other House members who supported the lawsuit: "The 126 Republican Members that signed onto this lawsuit brought dishonor to the House. Instead of upholding their oath to support and defend the Constitution, they chose to subvert the Constitution and undermine public trust in our sacred democratic institutions."

As of January 2022, Huizenga has voted with President Biden's stated position roughly 14% of the time.

Committee assignments 
 Committee on Financial Services
 Subcommittee on Financial Institutions and Consumer Credit
 Subcommittee on Domestic Monetary Policy and Technology
 Subcommittee on International Monetary Policy and Trade

Caucus memberships 
 Republican Study Committee
 Congressional Constitution Caucus
Republican Main Street Partnership

Political positions

Marriage
Huizenga voted against the "Respect for Marriage Act" codifying Loving v. Virginia and Obergefell v. Hodges, recognizing marriages across state lines regardless of "sex, race, ethnicity, or national origin of those individuals."

Personal life
Huizenga and his wife have five children and live in Holland. He attends Haven Christian Reformed Church in Zeeland.

On October 14, 2020, Huizenga announced that he had tested positive for COVID-19.

References

External links
 Congressman Bill Huizenga official U.S. House website
 Campaign website
 
 
 
 Bill Huizenga at MichiganVotes.org
 Voting record: 2003–2004, 2005–2006, 2007–2008

Articles
 Jay Riemersma criticizes Bill Huizenga's 2007 Vote, Jim Harger, Grand Rapids Press, October 12, 2009
 No Worker Left Behind After Three Years: Successes and Challenges, Andrew S. Levin, Michigan.gov, June 29, 2010

|-

|-

1969 births
21st-century American politicians
American people of Dutch descent
Category:American Calvinist and Reformed Christians
Christians from Michigan
Living people
Republican Party members of the Michigan House of Representatives
People from Jenison, Michigan
People from Zeeland, Michigan
Republican Party members of the United States House of Representatives from Michigan